Dalla pulchra is a species of butterfly in the family Hesperiidae. It is found in Costa Rica.

References

Butterflies described in 1900
pulchra
Butterflies of Central America
Taxa named by Frederick DuCane Godman